

Konrad-Oskar Heinrichs (5 May 1890 – 8 September 1944) was a German general in the Wehrmacht who commanded several divisions. He was a recipient of the Knight's Cross of the Iron Cross. Heinrichs was killed on 8 September 1944 near Liège, Belgium.

Awards and decorations

 Knight's Cross of the Iron Cross on 13 September 1941 as Oberst and commander of Infanterie-Regiment 24

References

Citations

Bibliography

 

1890 births
1944 deaths
People from Altmarkkreis Salzwedel
People from the Province of Saxony
Lieutenant generals of the German Army (Wehrmacht)
World War I prisoners of war held by France
German prisoners of war in World War I
Recipients of the clasp to the Iron Cross, 1st class
Recipients of the Gold German Cross
Recipients of the Knight's Cross of the Iron Cross
German Army personnel killed in World War II
Military personnel from Saxony-Anhalt
German Army generals of World War II